Madame Du Barry or Du Barry is a 1917 American silent historical drama film directed by J. Gordon Edwards and starring Theda Bara. The film is based on the French novel Memoirs d’un médecin by Alexandre Dumas.

Plot
As described in a film magazine, Madame Jeanne Du Barry (Bara) becomes the reigning favorite of Louis XV (Clary) and enjoys this distinction until the sudden death of the king. The lavish mode of living by the king and Jeanne Du Barry arouse the wrath of the peasant class, and after the death of the king a revolution breaks out. Jeanne is made to suffer through the revolution and pays the ultimate price on the guillotine.

Cast
 Theda Bara as Madame Du Barry
 Charles Clary as Louis XV
 Fred Church as Cossé-Brissac
 Herschel Mayall as Jean DuBarry
 Genevieve Blinn as Duchess deGaumont
 Willard Louis as Guillaume DuBarry
 Hector Sarno as Lebel
 Dorothy Drake as Henriette
 Rosita Marstini as Mother Savord
 Joe King

Reception
Like many American films of the time, Madame Du Barry was subject to cuts by city and state film censorship boards. The Chicago Board of Censors required a cut of Madame Du Barry lying on the guillotine and the closeup of the blade.

Preservation status
This film is now considered to be a lost film. Many of Theda Bara's films were destroyed in the 1937 Fox Studios vault fire.

See also
List of lost films
1937 Fox vault fire

References

External links

1917 films
1917 drama films
1910s historical drama films
Fox Film films
American historical drama films
American silent feature films
American black-and-white films
Films based on French novels
Films based on works by Alexandre Dumas
Films directed by J. Gordon Edwards
Films set in France
Films set in the 1770s
Lost American films
Cultural depictions of Louis XV
Cultural depictions of Madame du Barry
Works about Louis XV
1910s American films
Silent American drama films
1910s English-language films